Fuldabrück is a municipality in the district of Kassel, in Hesse, Germany. It is situated along the Fulda river, 8 kilometers south of Kassel.  The municipality of Fuldabrück consists of the former independent villages Bergshausen, Dittershausen, Dennhausen and Dörnhagen.

Geography 
Fuldabrück borders with 5 communities:
 Kassel in the northwest,
 Lohfelden in the northeast,
 Söhrewald in the east,
 Guxhagen in the south,
 Baunatal in the west

References

Kassel (district)